(also known as Manardi or Mainardi; Latin: Iohannes Manardus; 24 July 1462 – 8 March 1536) was an Italian physician, botanist, and humanist.

Biography 
Born into an old family of Ferrara, Manardo was a follower of Leoniceno, whom he succeeded in 1525 as the chair of medicine at the University of Ferrara. Having begun to teach in the University of Ferrara, he worked as the personal physician to Pico della Mirandola from 1493 to 1504. From 1513 to 1518, he was the court physician to the Jagiellonian kings of Hungary, Vladislaus II and his son, Louis II. He then returned to the Este household in Ferrara,  to provide for the health of Alfonso d'Este. In 1533, he was with another student of Leoniceno, one of the doctors who attempted to cure Ludovico Ariosto.

In 1494, on the death of Giovanni Pico della Mirandola, Manardo oversaw the publication of his Disputationes adversum Astrologiam divinatricem, in which the philosopher criticized astrological beliefs and practices, marking a clear distinction between astronomy (mathematical or speculative astrology), which studied the harmonic reality of the universe, and astrology (judicial or divining astrology), which supposedly revealed the future of men according to astral conjunctures. Manardo also participated in debates on syphilis, particularly in Ferrara and Leipzig, where he wrote a pamphlet entitled De erroribus Symonis Pistoris de Lypczk circa morbum gallicum, published in 1500 in Nuremberg.

While Manardo had already shown his ability to apply philological principles to medical science in his commentary on Galen's Ars Parva, his humanist erudition was evidenced especially in his Epistolae Medicinales which started to be released in bits and pieces starting in 1528, but which was not fully published until after his death in Basel in 1540, after which it went through numerous posthumous editions.
The Epistolae combined the traditions of councils, forums and philological discussions about medicine and botany to the field of pharmacological terminology. The Epistolae, besides criticizing the botanical knowledge informed by Arabic medicine, described the anthers of flowers (belonging to the angiosperms) for the first time, and had a particular influence on François Rabelais who republished it in Lyon, because he saw in Manardo's work both a useful contribution to restoring medicine to the prestige it had once enjoyed in antiquity, as well as being an authoritative voice underlying the renewal of culture.

Publications

See also

 Antonio Musa Brassavola (1500-1555) 
 Giorgio Valla (1447-1500)
 Ludovico Ariosto (1474-1533)
  (1475-1536)

References

Sources

"Atti del convegno internazionale per la celebrazione del V centenario della nascita di Giovanni Manardo, 1462-1536" (Ferrara, 8–9 December 1962), University of Ferrara, 1963.
D. Mugnai-Carrara, Epistemological problems in Giovanni Mainardi's Commentary on Galen's Ars Parva, in A. Grafton & N.G. Siraisi (ed.), Natural Particulars. Nature and the disciplines in Renaissance Europe, Massachusetts Institute of Technology, Cambridge 1999, pp. 251–274.
M. Palumbo, "MANARDI (Manardo), Giovanni", in Dizionario Biografico degli Italiani, Volume 68, Roma, Istituto dell'Enciclopedia Italiana, 2007.
P. Zambelli, Giovanni Mainardi e la polemica sull'astrologia, in L'opera e il pensiero di Giovanni Pico della Mirandola nella storia dell'umanesimo, Atti del convegno internazionale (Mirandola, 15–18 September 1963), vol. II, Florence, 1965, pp. 205–279.

External links

1462 births
1536 deaths
Physicians from Ferrara
Academic staff of the University of Ferrara
16th-century Italian physicians
Pre-Linnaean botanists
Scientists from Ferrara
Italian Renaissance humanists